Anthony Fawcett (born 29 June 1951) is a South African former professional tennis player active in the 1970s.

Fawcett, who competed under the flag of Rhodesia, was a singles main draw qualifier at the 1975 Wimbledon Championships. He played what is believed to be the longest game in tennis history during his match against Keith Glass at the Surrey Championships in 1975. Glass's service game contained 37 deuces. Although not timed, the game went long enough that as it was ongoing, a women's match on an adjacent court began and finished.

References

External links
 
 

1951 births
Living people
Rhodesian male tennis players